Alwand may refer to:

 Alwand Quli, a village in Kurdistan Province, Iran
Alwand River, in eastern Iraq and western Iran

See also
Alvand (disambiguation)
Alwandi, a village in Karnataka, India